This is a partial list of women artists who were born in Canada or whose artworks are closely associated with that country.

A
Andréanne Abbondanza-Bergeron, installation art
Kirsten Abrahamson (born 1960), ceramist
Una Stella Abrahamson (1922–1999), artist, writer
KC Adams (born 1971), multimedia art
Marilla Adams (1864–1966) 
Catherine Addai (fl 2019), Ghanaian-Canadian fashion designer
Amelia Alcock-White (born 1981), painting
Lady Eveline Marie Alexander (1821–1906), painter 
Vikky Alexander (born 1959), photography, video art
Wilhelmina Alexander (1871–1961), painting
Jocelyne Alloucherie (born 1947), sculpture
Helen Andersen (1919–1995), painting
Lois Andison, installation art
Julie Andreyev (born 1962), multidisciplinary art
Evelyn Andrus (1909–1972), photographer
Jaime Angelopoulos, sculptor
Sara Angelucci (born 1962), photography, video art
Marie-Elmina Anger (1844–1901), painting
Jennifer Angus (born 1961), installation art
Elizabeth Angrnaqquaq (1916–2003), textile artist
Irene Kataq Angutitok (1914–1971), sculpture
Margaret Uyauperq Aniksak (1907–1993), sculpture
Danielle April (born 1949)
Raymonde April (born 1953), photography
Joi Arcand (born 1982), photography
Kate Armstrong, net art, writing
Shelagh Armstrong (born 1961), illustration
Germaine Arnaktauyok (born 1946), printmaking, painting
Myfanwy Ashmore (born 1970), new media art
Shuvinai Ashoona (born 1961), drawing
Asinnajaq  (born 1991), video artist
Barbara Astman (born 1950), photography, new media
Melissa Auf der Maur (born 1972), photography

B
Lida Baday (born 1957), fashion designer
Buseje Bailey, video and multi-media 
Unity Bainbridge (1916–2017), painting
Anna P. Baker (1928–1985), painting
Joan Balzar (1928–2016), painting
Anna Banana (born 1940), performance art, stamp art, small press publishing
Marian Penner Bancroft (born 1947), photography
Marian Bantjes (born 1963), design, illustration, writing
Annie Gardner Barr (1864–1921)
Lorna Bauer (born 1980), multi-media artist
Tammy Beauvais (fl 1999), indigenous fashion designer
Fanny Wright Bayfield (1813/14–1891), botanical illustration
Anong Beam (fl 2002), indigenous painter
Micheline Beauchemin (1929–2009), textile arts
Claire Beaulieu (born 1955), multi-media
Marie-Hélène Beaulieu (born 1979), glass artist
Betty Beaumont (born 1946), environmental art
Kate Beaton (born 1983), comics artist
Beaver Hall Group
Sarah Beck, sculpture
Sylvie Bélanger (1951–2020), video, photography, installation
Christi Belcourt (born 1966), painting
Rebecca Belmore (born 1960), performance, installation
Lorraine Bénic (born 1937), painting, sculpture
Cecilia Berkovic, mixed-media artist
Rachel Berman (1946–2014), painting, illustration
Judith Berry (born 1961), painting
Edith Hallett Bethune (1890–1970), photographer
Nia Faith Betty (born 2001), fashion designer
Aggie Beynon, metalwork
Olive Biller (1879–1957), painting, illustration
Alexandra Biriukova (1895–1967), architect 
Yulia Biriukova (1897–1972), painting 
Mary E. Black (1895–1988), textile arts, writing
Persimmon Blackbridge (born 1951), performance art, installation, video, sculpture, writing
Valérie Blass (born 1967), sculpture
Susanna Blunt (born 1955), painting
Molly Bobak (1922–2014), printmaking, painting
Eleanor Bond (born 1948), painting, printmaking, sculpture
Marion Bond (1903–1965), painting
Mary Borgstrom (1916–2019), ceramics, primitive pottery   
Diane Borsato (born 1973), performance, installation, photography, video
Dianne Bos (born 1956), photographer
Céline Boucher (born 1945), painting, drawing, sculpture
Diana Boulay (born 1946), sculpture
Marie-Claude Bouthillier (born 1960), contemporary artist
Deanna Bowen (born 1969), video, installation, performance, sculpture, photography
Fiona Bowie, film, video, photography, sculpture
Shary Boyle (born 1972), sculpture, painting, performance
Sheree Bradford-Lea (fl 1994), cartoonist
Alexandra Bradshaw (1888–1981), watercolors
Eva Theresa Bradshaw (1871–1938), painting
Sandra Bromley, sculpture
Reva Brooks (1913–2004), photography
Vera Brosgol (born 1984), cartoonist
Lorna Brown (born 1958), public art
Karin Bubaš (born 1976), photography, painting
Annemarie Buchmann-Gerber (1947–2015), textiles, fiber arts
Krista Buecking (born 1982), sculpture, installation
Tishynah Buffalo (fl 2010), indigenous fashion designer
Angela Bulloch (born 1966), installation, sound
Nina Bunjevac (born 1973), Serbian-Canadian cartoonist
Della Burford (born 1946), painting, writing
Kay Burns, performance, locative media, photography, sculpture, video
Cathy Bursey-Sabourin (born 1957), design
Cathy Busby (born 1958), printed matter
Sheila Butler (born 1938), painting, printmaking

C
Geneviève Cadieux (born 1955), photography
Sveva Caetani (1917–1994), watercolors
Ghitta Caiserman-Roth (1923–2005), painting and printmaking
Dorothy Caldwell (born 1948), fiber arts
Chrystal Callahan, photography
Elaine Cameron-Weir (born 1985), sculpture
Dale Campbell (born 1954), carving
Valerie Campbell-Harding (1932–2006), textile arts
Nicole Camphaug (fl 2015), Inuk fashion designer
Janet Cardiff (born 1957), sound installation
Florence Carlyle (1864–1923), painting
J.R. Carpenter (born 1972), hypermedia, writing
Emily Carr (1871–1945), painting
Geneviève Castrée (1981–2016), comics, illustration
Mabel Cawthra (1871–1943), painting
Christiane Chabot (born 1950), multidisciplinary 
Ruth Chambers (born 1960), installation art
Millicent Mary Chaplin (1790–1858), watercolour
Monique Charbonneau (1928–2014), painter
Lyne Charlebois, photography
Judy Chartrand (born 1959), ceramics, found object art, beadwork, quillwork
Svetlana Chmakova (born 1979), comics
Olivia Chow (born 1957), sculpture
Delores Churchill (born 1929), weaving
June Clark (artist) (born 1941), photography, sculpture and collage 
Paraskeva Clark (1898–1986), painting
Dana Claxton (born 1959), filmmaking, photography, performance art
Alberta Cleland (1876–1960), painting
Wendy Coburn (1963–2015), sculpture
Lynne Cohen (1944–2014), photography
Martha Cole (born 1946), textiles, artist's books
Susan Collett (born 1961), printmaker, ceramist
Katherine Collins (born 1947), cartoonist, writer, composer
Nicole Collins, painting, performance, video, sound art
Petra Collins (born 1992), photography
Nora Collyer (1898–1979), painting
Stéphanie Colvey (born 1949), photography
Edith Grace Coombs (1890–1986), painting
Emily Coonan (1885–1971), painting
Corno (1952–2016), painting
Michèle Cournoyer (born 1943), animation
Linda Craddock (born 1952), visual artist
Kate Craig (1947–2002), video, performance art
Sarah Lindley Crease (1826–1922), watercolors, botanical illustration
Marlene Creates (born 1952), photography
Jill Culiner (born 1945), photography
Jane Catherine Cummins (1841–1893), painting
Ruth Cuthand (born 1954) painting, printmaking
Randy Lee Cutler (born 1964), collage, performance, writing
Gertrude Spurr Cutts (1858–1941), painting
Nina Czegledy, new media

D
Karen Dahl (born 1955), ceramics artist
Greta Dale (1929–1978), sculptor
Kathleen Daly (1898–1994), painter
Madeleine Dansereau (1922–1991), jeweler
Sylvia Daoust (1902–2004), sculptor
Karin Davie (born 1965), painter
Char Davies (born 1954), multimedia artist
Sally Davies (born 1956), painter, photographer
Olea Marion Davis (1899–1977), sculptor, ceramist
Paloma Dawkins (fl 2015), cartoonist, video game designer
Katherine Day (1889–1976), painter, printmaker
Adriana de Barros (born 1976), illustrator, web designer, and poet
Dora de Pedery-Hunt (1913–2008), sculptor
Roseline Delisle (1952–2003), ceramic artist
Jen Delos Reyes
Angela DeMontigny (fl 1995), indigenous fashion designer
Shawna Dempsey and Lorri Millan
Simone Dénéchaud (1905–1974), painter
Kady MacDonald Denton (born 1941), children's book illustrator
Bonnie Devine (born 1952)
Sarindar Dhaliwal (born 1953), multimedia artist
Freda Diesing (1925–2002), carver
Mary Dignam (1857–1938), painter
Jess Dobkin (born 1970), performance artist
Susan Dobson (born 1965), photographer and installation artist
Katherine Dodds
Melissa Doherty (born 1967), painter
Eva Brook Donly (1867–1941), painter
Audrey Capel Doray (born 1931), painter, printmaker, electronic artist, muralist, filmmaker
Julie Doucet (1867–1941), painter
Marie-Denise Douyon (born 1961), painter, illustrator
Anne Macintosh Duff (1925–2022), watercolour artist
Aleksandra Dulic (born 1973), interactive installation artist, performer
Delree Dumont, painter
Alma Duncan (1917–2004), painter, filmmaker
Carol Dunlop (1946–1982), photographer
Chantal duPont (1942–2019), multidisciplinary artist
Dominique Dupuis (born 1987)
Aganetha Dyck (born 1937), sculptor

E
Mary Alexandra Bell Eastlake (1854–1951), painter
Jessica Eaton (born 1977), photographer
Hayley Elsaesser, fashion designer
Julie Enfield, photographer
Panya Clark Espinal (born 1965), sculptor
Kingmeata Etidlooie (1915–1989), visual artist and sculptor
Leya Evelyn (1937 births), painter
Janieta Eyre (born 1971), photographer

F
Lilias Farley (1907–1989), painter, sculptor, muralist
Caroline Farncomb (1859–1951), painter
Claire Fauteux (1889–1988), painter
Holly Fay, painter
Lillian Prest Ferguson (1867–1955), painter
Marcelle Ferron (1924–2001), painter
Julie Flett, painter
Lita Fontaine, interdisciplinary artist
Harriet Mary Ford (1859–1938), painter, muralist, jeweler
Nita Forrest (1926–1996), painter
Mina Forsyth (1921–1987), painter
Hannah Franklin (born 1937), painter, sculptor
Leanne Franson (born 1963), illustrator, cartoonist
Maida Parlow French (1891–1977), artist and writer
Vera Frenkel (born 1938), multidisciplinary artist
Janine Fuller (born 1958)

G
Peggy Gale (born 1944), curator
Millie Gamble (1887–1986), photographer
Ariel Garten (born 1979), fashion designer, artist
Marianna Gartner (born 1963), painter
Alyne Gauthier-Charlebois (1908–1955), painter
Marie-Louise Gay (born 1952), illustrator
Erin Gee (born 1983), new media and interactive artist
Rosemary Georgeson, multimedia artist
Lise Gervais (1933–1998), painter, sculptor
Karine Giboulo (born 1980), diorama artist
Lorraine Gilbert (born 1955), photographer
Melanie Gilligan (born 1979)
Miriam Ginestier (born 1968), interdisciplinary performance curator
Seema Goel, multidisciplinary artist
Dina Goldstein (born 1969), photographer
Betty Goodwin (1923–2008), painter, sculptor
Hortense Gordon (1886–1961), abstract artist
Pnina Granirer (born 1935), painter
Jill Greenberg (born 1967), photographer
Erica Deichmann Gregg (1913–2007), studio potter
Dorothy Grant (fl 1988), indigenous fashion designer
Angela Graurholz (born 1952), photographer
Grimes (born 1988), visual artist
Angela Grossmann (born 1955), painter
Pia Guerra, comic book artist

H
Alice Mary Hagen (1872–1972), potter
Clara Hagarty (1871–1958), painter
Libby Hague (born 1950), installation artist
Amanda K. Hale
Elizabeth Amherst Hale (1774–1826), painter
Jean Hall (1896–1982), architect, known for mechanical drawing
Sarah Hall (born 1951), stained glass artist
Henrietta Hamilton (1780–1857), painter
Mary Riter Hamilton (1873–1954), painter
Lyn Hancock, photojournalist, wildlife photographer
Ann Alexandra Harbuz (1908–1989), folk artist
Naomi Harris (born 1973), photographer
Teva Harrison (1976–2019), graphic artist, illustrator
Iris Hauser (born 1956), painter
Iris Häussler (born 1962), installation artist
Bobs Cogill Haworth (1900–1988), painter, potter
Elora Hardy (fl 2010), fashion designer
Eileen Hazell (1903–1984), sculptor, potter
Estelle Hecht (died 1971), printer, gallery owner
Janet Hetherington (born 1955)
Prudence Heward (1896–1947), painter
Annie Hewlett (1887–1974), artist and writer
Faith Erin Hicks, cartoonist, animator
Esther Hill (1895–1985), architect, designer
Gilah Yelin Hirsch (born 1944), painter
Marla Hlady (born 1965), painter, sculptor
Adrianne Ho (fl 2021), fashion designer
Elizabeth Bradford Holbrook (1913–2009), portrait sculptor, medal designer, liturgical artist
Heidi Hollinger (born 1968), photographer
Margaret Lindsay Holton (born 1955), painter
Risa Horowitz (born 1970), visual and media artist
Yvonne McKague Housser (1897–1996), painter
Barbara Howard (1926–2002), painter, engraver
Ruth Howard (born 1957)
Amelia Frances Howard-Gibbon (1826–1874), painter
Spring Hurlbut (born 1952), sculptor

I
Iola Abraham Ikkidluak (1936–2003), sculptor
Dana Inkster, media artist, filmmaker
Olive Mamak Innakatsik (1915–1994)
Carole Itter (born 1939), sculptor, filmmaker
Jane Isakson  (born 1965), painter

J
Sarah Jackson (1924–2004), sculptor, digital artist
Sybil Henley Jacobson (1881–1953), painter
Ann James (1925–2011), sculptor, ceramist
Aurora James (born 1984), fashion designer
Tara Jarmon (fl 1990s), fashion designer
Lucy Jarvis (1896–1985), painter
Doreen Jensen (1933–2009), sculptor, curator
Sophie Jodoin (born 1965), visual artist
Laurel Johannesson
Ursula Johnson (born 1980), multidisciplinary artist
Gladys Johnston (1906–1983), landscape painter
Lynn Johnston (born 1947), cartoonist
G. B. Jones (born 1965), musician, artist and filmmaker
Janet Jones (born 1952), painter
Michaele Jordana (born 1947), painter
Bushra Junaid, painter, curator

K
Victoria Kakuktinniq (born 1989), Inuk fashion designer
Nomi Kaplan (born 1933), Lithuanian-Canadian photographer 
Zahra Kazemi (1948–2003), photographer
Gertrude Kearns (born 1950), war artist
Shelagh Keeley (born 1954)
Siassie Kenneally (1969–2018)
Marsha Kennedy (born 1951)
Janice Kerbel (born 1969)
Estelle Muriel Kerr (1879–1971)
Katja MacLeod Kessin (1959–2006), painter
Najat El-Khairy
Arounna Khounnoraj, textile artist
Jane Kidd (born 1952), tapestry artist
Janet Kigusiuq (1926–2005)
Alicia Killaly (1836–1908), painter
Mabel Killam Day (1884–1960), artist
Ada Gladys Killins (1901–1963), painter
Winnifred Kingsford (1880–1947), sculptor
Ada Florence Kinton (1859–1905)
Ann Kipling (born 1934)
Germaine Koh (born 1967)
Wanda Koop (born 1951), painter
Elaine Kowalsky (1948–2005), printmaker
Donna Kriekle (born 1945)
Madeleine Isserkut Kringayak (1928–1984), sculptor
Myra Kukiiyaut (1929–2006), Inuit artist
Maya Kulenovic (born 1975), painter
Anita Kunz (born 1956)

L
Sophie Labelle (fl 2013), cartoonist
Françoise Labbé (1933–2001)
Martha Ladly
Laiwan (born 1961)
Suzy Lake (born 1947)
Gisèle Lamoureux (1942–2018), photographer
Artis Lane (born 1927), painter
Dawn Langstroth (born 1979), painter
Anne Langton (1804–1893), painter
Christine Laptuta (born 1951), photographer
Dinah Lauterman (1899–1945), sculptor
Michelle LaVallee (born 1977)
Marguerite Vincent Lawinonkié (1783–1865)
Caroline Leaf (born 1946)
Jo Lechay, painter
Edeline Lee (fl 2016), fashion designer
Sky Lee (born 1952)
Jennifer Lefort (born 1976), painter
Martha Stewart Leitch (1918–2015)
Irène Legendre (1904–1992), painter
Enid Legros-Wise (born 1943), ceramist
Rita Letendre (1928–2021), painter
Laura Letinsky (born 1962), photographer
Marilyn Levine (1935–2005)
Maud Lewis (1903–1970), painter
Tau Lewis (born 1993), contemporary artist
Mabel Lockerby (1882–1976), painter
Judith Lodge (born 1941), painter and photographer
Karen Lofgren (born 1976)
Marion Long (1882–1970), painter
Mary Longman (born 1964)
Frances Loring (1887–1968)
Michèle Lorrain (born 1960), painter and installation artist
Irene Loughlin (born 1967)
Helen Lucas (born 1931)
Alexandra Luke (1901–1967), painter
Linda Lundström (born 1951), fashion designer
Irene Luxbacher (born 1970)
Laura Muntz Lyall (1860–1930), painter

M
Toshiko MacAdam (born 1940)
Landon Mackenzie (born 1954), painter 
Myfanwy MacLeod (born 1961)
Lani Maestro (born 1957)
Liz Magor (born 1948)
Jeannie Mah (born 1952)
Christine Major (born 1966), painter
Lorraine Malach (1933–2003), ceramist, painter
Erin Manning (born 1969)
Jovette Marchessault (1938–2012)
Deborah Margo (born 1961), multimedia artist
Tanya Mars (born 1948), performance and video artist
Agnes Martin (1912–2004), painter
Annie Martin
Camille Martin (born 1956)
Paryse Martin (born 1959)
Jean Mathieson
Mabel May (1877–1971), painter
Elza Mayhew (1916–2004), sculptor
Sanaz Mazinani (born 1978)
Jo-Anne McArthur (born 1976), photographer
Kelly McCallum (born 1979)
Doris McCarthy (1910–2010), painter
Jillian McDonald
Susan McEachern (born 1951)
Elizabeth McGillivray Knowles (1866–1928), painter
Florence Helena McGillivray (1864–1938), painter
Barbara McGivern (1945–2019), painter
Elizabeth McIntosh (born 1967)
Rita McKeough (born 1951)
Mary R. McKie (active 1840–1862), painter
Ruth Gowdy McKinley (1931–1981), ceramist
Sheila McKinnon, photographer
Isabel McLaughlin (1903–2002), painter
Helen McLean (born 1927)
Dayna McLeod (born 1972)
Pegi Nicol MacLeod (1904–1949), painter
Fannie Knowling McNeil (1869–1928)
Helen McNicoll (1879–1915), painter
Margaret Campbell Macpherson (1860–1931), painter
Lucy Meeko (1929–2004), sculptor, printmaker, basket maker and seamstress
Divya Mehra (born 1981)
Sandra Meigs (born 1953), painter
Barbara Meneley
Olia Mishchenko (born 1980)
Tricia Middleton (born 1972)
Lorna Mills
Carol Milne (born 1962)
Lisa Milroy (born 1959), painter
Allyson Mitchell (born 1967)
Ellen Moffat (born 1954)
Lorraine Monk (1922–2020), photographer
Belinda Montgomery (born 1950), painter
Geraldine Moodie (1854–1945), photographer
Julie Moos (born 1966), photographer and art writer
Shani Mootoo (born 1957), painter
Kathleen Morris (1893–1986), painter
Alexandra Morrison
Rita Mount (1885–1967), painter
Clara Mountcastle (1837–1908), painter
Kathleen Munn (1887–1974), painter
Paula Murray (born 1958)
Nadia Myre (born 1974)

N
Melaw Nakehk'o, painter
Agnes Nanogak (1925–2001)
Mina Napartuk (1913–2001), Inuit fashion designer
Imona Natsiapik (born 1966)
Ellen Neel (1916–1966)
Tracey Neuls
Lilias Torrance Newton (1896–1980), painter
Grace Nickel (born 1956), ceramist
Marion Nicoll (1909–1985), painter
Shelley Niro (born 1954), painter
Marie-Paule Nolin (1908–1987), fashion designer
Farah Nosh, photojournalist
Guity Novin (born 1944), painter

O
Alanis Obomsawin (born 1932)
Daphne Odjig (1919–2016), painter
Ethel Ogden (1869–1902), painter and educator
Katie Ohe (born 1937), sculptor
Lucille Oille (1912–1997), sculptor, wood engraver and book illustrator
Maudie Rachel Okittuq (born 1944), sculptor
Kim Ondaatje (born 1928), painter
Midi Onodera (born 1961)
Jessie Oonark (1906–1985)
Sheila Shaen Orr (born 1964)

P
P. K. Page (1916–2010), painter
Mimi Parent (1924–2005)
Edie Parker (born 1956)
Helen Parsons Shepherd (1923–2008), painter
Roula Partheniou (born 1977), contemporary artist
Barbara Paterson (born 1935)
Myfanwy Pavelic (1916–2007), portrait painter
Jan Peacock (born 1955)
Sophie Pemberton (1869–1959), painter
Dany Pen (born 1986), artist, activist, and educator
Rae Perlin (1910–2006), painter
Vessna Perunovich (born 1960), painter, sculptor
Nancy Petry (born 1931)
Christiane Pflug (1936–1972), painter
Ciara Phillips (born 1976)
Paulette Phillips (born 1956)
Rina Piccolo, cartoonist
Marjorie Pigott (1904–1990)
Bev Pike
Susan Point (born 1952)
Jane Ash Poitras (born 1951), painter
Annie Pootoogook (1969–2016)
Napachie Pootoogook (1938–2002), graphic artist
Sharni Pootoogook (1922–2003), printmaker
Alicia Popoff (1950–2015), painter
Barbara Pratt (born 1963), painter
Mary Pratt (1935–2018), painter
Innukjuakju Pudlat (1913–1972),  printmaker
Lucy Pullen (born 1971), contemporary artist

Q
Mary Qayuaryuk (1908–1982), printmaker and midwife
Lucy Qinnuayuak (1915–1982), graphic artist and printmaker
Nathalie Quagliotto (born 1984)
Ruth Qaulluaryuk (born 1932), Inuit textile artist
Quilla (born 1982)

R
Rosemary Radcliffe (born 1949), painter
Judy Radul (born 1962)
Anirnik Ragee (born 1935), visual artist
Nina Raginsky (born 1941), photographer
Sheilah Wilson ReStack (born 1975) video artist
Kina Reusch (1940–1988)
Catherine Richards (born 1952)
Sue Richards (1958–2014)
Lynn Richardson
Alix Cléo Roubaud (1952–1983), photographer
Louise Robert (born 1941), painter
Sarah Robertson (1891–1948), painter
Christine Roche (born 1939), illustrator, cartoonist
Danièle Rochon (born 1946), painter
Dorothea Rockburne (born 1932), painter
Ethel Rosenfield (1910–2000), sculptor
Elizabeth Eaton Rosenthal (born 1941)
Hilda Katherine Ross (1902–unknown), potter, painter, and educator
Susan Ross (1915–2006), painter
Mariette Rousseau-Vermette (1926–2006), tapestry artist
Marina Roy, painter
Lorna Russell (born 1933), painter

S
Pitaloosie Saila (1942–2021)
Buffy Sainte-Marie (born 1941)
Taslim Samji
Eliyakota Samualie (1939–1987), graphic artist and sculptor
Nicotye Samayualie (born 1983), graphic artist
Anne Savage (1896–1971), painter
Charlotte Schreiber (1834–1922), painter
Marian Dale Scott (1906–1993), painter
Mary Scott (born 1948), painter
Ethel Seath (1879–1963), painter
Regina Seiden (1897–1991), painter
Sandra Semchuck (born 1948), photographer
Catherine Senitt (born 1945), painter
Bojana Sentaler (fl 2000s), Serbian-Canadian fashion designer
Susan Shantz (born 1957)
Margaret Shelton (1915–1984)
Erin Shirreff (born 1975)
Henrietta Shore (1880–1963), painter
Adele Sigguk (born 1961)
Floria Sigismondi (born 1965), photographer
Elizabeth Simcoe (1762–1850), painter
Lorraine Simms (born 1956), painter
Leah Singer, photographer and multimedia artist
Clara Sipprell (1885–1975), photographer
Cathy Sisler
Ruby Slipperjack (born 1952), painter
Edith Smith (1867–1954), painter
Freda Pemberton Smith (1902–1991), painter
Jori Smith (1907–2005), painter
Frances-Anne Solomon (born 1966)
Doris Huestis Speirs (1894–1989), painter
Arlene Stamp (born 1938)
Lisa Steele (born 1947)
Noreen Stevens (born 1962), cartoonist
Penelope Stewart
Marie Elyse St. George (born 1929)
Jana Sterbak (born 1955), sculptor
Reva Stone (born 1944)
Leesa Streifler (born 1957)
Martha Sturdy (born 1942)
 Gio Swaby (born 1991)
Magda Szabo (born 1934), painter

T
Tanya Tagaq (born 1975)
Ernestine Tahedl (born 1940)
Sylvia Tait (born 1932), painter
Jillian Tamaki (born 1980)
Mariko Tamaki (born 1975)
Janice Tanton (born 1961)
Monica Tap (born 1962), painter
Ewa Tarsia (born 1959)
Tanya Taylor (fl 2012), fashion designer
Angotigolu Teevee (1910–1967), printmaker
Ningeokuluk Teevee (born 1963)
Althea Thauberger (born 1970), photographer
Jeannie Thib (1955–2013), sculptor
Jan Thornhill (born 1955)
Mildred Valley Thornton (1890–1967), painter
Irene Avaalaaqiaq Tiktaalaaq (born 1941)
Joanne Tod (born 1953)
Gayla Trail (born 1973), photographer
Sydney Strickland Tully (1860–1911)
Camille Turner (born 1960)
Natalie Turner
Lucy Tasseor Tutsweetok (1934–2012), sculptor
Marion Tuu'luq (1910–2002), Inuk textile artist

U 

 Kartz Ucci (1961–2013)
Malorie Urbanovitch (born 1988), fashion designer

V
Florence Vale (1909–2003), painter
Liz Vandal (fl 1988), fashion designer
Blanche Lemco van Ginkel (1923–2022)
Claire Van Vliet (born 1933)
Margaret Elizabeth Vanderhaeghe (1950–2012)
Laura Vickerson (born 1959)
Rita Vinieris (fl 1995), fashion designer
Lea Vivot (born 1948), sculptor

W
Marion Wagschal (born 1943), painter
Carol Wainio (born 1955), painter
Laurie Walker (1962–2011)
Marilyn I. Walker (1934/1935–2015)
Katherine Wallis (1861–1957), sculptor
Edith Watson (1861–1943), photographer
Barbara Weaver-Bosson (born 1953) - painter
Anna Weber (1814–1888), fraktur artist and needleworker
Laura Wee Láy Láq (born 1952), ceramicist
Susanna Haliburton Weldon (1817–1899), artist and ceramics collector
Esther Wertheimer (1926–2016), sculptor
Colette Whiten (born 1945), sculptor
Irene Whittome (born 1942)
Joyce Wieland (1930–1998)
Shirley Wiitasalo (born 1949), painter
Tania Willard (born 1977)
Jennifer Willet (born 1975), artist, researcher and curator
Margaux Williamson (born 1976)
Shannon Wilson fashion designer
Winsom (born 1946), multimedia artist
Chloe Wise (born 1990)
Catherine Mary Wisnicki (1919–2014)
Colleen Wolstenholme (born 1963), sculptor
Elizabeth Wyn Wood (1903–1966), sculptor
Kamila Wozniakowska (born 1956), painter
Janice Wright-Cheney (born 1961)
Mary E. Wrinch (1877–1969), painter
Adrienne Wu (born 1990), fashion designer
Florence Wyle (1881–1968), sculptor
Dana Wyse (born 1965)

Y
Xiaojing Yan (born 1978)
M. A. Yewdale (1908–2000)
Jin-me Yoon (born 1960)
Jinny Yu (born 1976), painter and installation artist

Z 
 Joy Zemel Long (1922–2018), painter
 Marguerite Porter Zwicker (1904–1993), painter

References

Women
Canada
Artists